Persidom Dompu (or the abbreviation Persatuan Sepakbola Indonesia Dompu) is an Indonesian football team headquartered in GOR Dompu Stadium, Dompu Regency, West Nusa Tenggara. This team competes in Liga 3 West Nusa Tenggara zone.

Honours
Liga 3 West Nusa Tenggara
Semifinals: 2021

References

External links

Dompu Regency
Football clubs in Indonesia
Football clubs in West Nusa Tenggara
Association football clubs established in 1967
1967 establishments in Indonesia